Coleophora elegans is a species of moth in the family Coleophoridae. It is found in South Africa, where it has been recorded from the Western Cape and Northern Cape. The type locality is Cape of Good Hope Nature Reserve.

References 

 

elegans
Moths described in 2015
Moths of Africa